The Stolpersteine in Kolín lists the Stolpersteine in the town of Kolín in the Central Bohemian Region. Stolpersteine is the German name for stumbling blocks collocated all over Europe by German artist Gunter Demnig. They remember the fate of the Nazi victims being murdered, deported, exiled or driven to suicide.

Generally, the stumbling blocks are posed in front of the building where the victims had their last self-chosen residence. The name of the Stolpersteine in Czech is: Kameny zmizelých, stones of the disappeared.

Kolín 
A website lists 466 names of Jews from Kolín and, if known, what happened with them. Additional fourteen persons could not be identified. The Stolpersteine from Kolín thus memorize only a small fraction of the Jewish losses during the Shoah.

Dates of collocations 
The Stolpersteine in Kolín were collocated by the artist himself on the following dates:
 10 October 2008
 6 November 2009

The Czech Stolperstein project was initiated in 2008 by the Česká unie židovské mládeže (Czech Union of Jewish Youth) and was realized with the patronage of the Mayor of Prague.

See also 
 List of cities by country that have stolpersteine

External links

 stolpersteine.eu, Demnig's website
 holocaust.cz Czech databank of Holocaust victims
 Yad Vashem, Central Database of Shoah Victims' Names

References

Kolín
Monuments and memorials